A loan guarantee, in finance, is a promise by one party (the guarantor) to assume the debt obligation of a borrower if that borrower defaults. A guarantee can be limited or unlimited, making the guarantor liable for only a portion or all of the debt.

Private loan guarantees

There are two main types:
 Guarantor mortgages
 Unsecured guarantor loan

Guarantor mortgages 
Popular with young borrowers who do not have a large deposit saved and need to borrow up to 100% of the property value to purchase a property. Generally, their parents will provide a guarantee to the lender to cover any shortfall in the event of default.

There are three main types 
 Guarantor Mortgage – generally, a parent or close family member will guarantee the mortgage debt and will cover the repayment obligations should the borrower default.
 Family offset mortgage – typically, a parent or grandparent will put their savings into an account linked to the borrower’s mortgage. They do not get any interest on these savings whilst offsetting the mortgage but will be able to get their money back in full once the mortgage has been paid down to between 70% and 80% of the property’s market value.
 Family deposit mortgage – a family member will place a deposit in a dedicated savings account and is held as security against the properties mortgage. Interest is paid on this deposit, but if the borrower defaults on their repayments then money will be taken from this savings account.

Unsecured guarantor loan 
An unsecured personal loan that is popular with borrowers who have a poor credit rating. They also require the guarantor to meet the borrower’s obligations if they default on their loan repayments.

Government loan guarantees
The term can be used to refer to a government to assume a private debt obligation if the borrower defaults. Most loan guarantee programs are established to correct perceived market failures by which small borrowers, regardless of creditworthiness, lack access to the credit resources available to large borrowers.

Loan guarantees can also be extended to large borrowers for national security reasons, to help companies in essential industries, or in situations where the failure of a large company will harm the larger economy, For example, Chrysler Corporation, one of the "big three" US automobile manufacturers, obtained a loan guarantee in 1979 amid its near-collapse, and lobbying by labor interests. The loans are made by private lenders with the caveat that the government will pay off the loans if the company defaults on them. Chrysler did not go into default. Another example was the creation of the Emergency Loan Guarantee Board to administer $250 million dollars in US government loan guarantees made to private lenders on behalf of Lockheed in 1971. The program ended in 1977 when Lockheed restructured its debt to its 24 lending banks. Over $30 million in Guarantee commitment fees paid by Lockheed and its lenders to the board created over $29 million transferred to the US treasury.

Government programs and agencies

Bulgaria 
National Guarantee Fund

The Netherlands 
 SME loan guarantee scheme (BMKB)

United Kingdom 
Enterprise Finance Guarantee

United States 
Fannie Mae
Export-Import Bank
Federal Family Education Loan Program
Freddie Mac
Government National Mortgage Association
Small Business Administration
USDOE
VA loan
USAID Development Credit Authority
 U.S. Department of Agriculture (USDA) Farm Service Agency (FSA) loans
 U.S. Department of Agriculture (USDA) Rural Development (RD) loans

See also
Surety
Promissory note
Usury

References 

Credit
Debt
Government finances
Loans